Black Blood Brothers, also known as BBB, is a light novel series written by Kōhei Azano and illustrated by Yuuya Kusaka. In 2006, Studio Live and Group TAC produced an anime based on the series. It is directed by Hiroaki Yoshikawa. It was licensed for North American release by Funimation Entertainment, with the first DVD being released in February 2008.

Plot 
Ten years later, Jiro heads to Hong Kong with his younger brother, Kotaro Mochizuki, in hopes of reaching The Special Zone, a thriving secret city where Vampires live-(which is separate from the human civilized parts of the city). They soon realize that a plan to infiltrate the Special Zone is being hatched by the Kowloon Children survivors. As they travel to The Special Zone, Jiro encounters enemies from the past and new threats that may endanger the safety of the Special Zone including the citizens. Kotaro's abduction, by one of the Kowloon Children, thrusts him even further into the battle. Along the way, he meets a human girl named Mimiko.

Kowloon Shock
Within the story, during the 1850s, a vampire who would later be known as the Kowloon King emerged in Hong Kong, China and began spreading his lineage to others.  The Kowloon Children, as his bloodline came to be known, differed from other bloodlines in that all humans (Or vampires) bitten by a Kowloon Child would become Kowloon Children themselves, even without a direct infusion of that bloodline's blood. The ensuing chaos made the existence of vampires, which until then had been living in secret, known to the entire world.  The conflict culminated in the Holy War, a battle in which humans and vampires worked together to exterminate the Kowloon Children. After the crusade, the Special Zone - a city for vampires to live - was established on the sea outside Japan. After the war, it was announced that all vampires had been killed, and most humans were kept ignorant of the existence of the Special Zone. Jiro Mochizuki, who became known as the Silver Blade, is a hero of the Crusade who defeated the Kowloon King, although he lost his lover and was betrayed by a close friend in the process...

Characters

Main characters

An Old Blood vampire that sided with the humans to fight against the Kowloon children during the Kowloon Shock.  Jiro was transformed into a vampire in 19th Century London.  He used to be a lieutenant in the Imperial Japanese Navy until he was severely injured in a fight protecting Alice.  Besides being an Old Blood, he also comes from a very special bloodline: the blood of the Sage.  He wields a long katana which has a blade made of silver. During the war, after defeating most of the Kowloon children, he became known as the Silver Blade and the Kin-killer. He is able to use some of the Kowloon powers as well as those of his own unique bloodline to be able to challenge even the Kowloon King and the three powers of the Special Zone.

He is weak against sunlight and water. He is shown being burned to the bones from staying into the ocean too long and releasing smoke under the sunlight, even though he was carrying an umbrella.  He has a little brother, Kotaro, who is the only other vampire who shares his bloodline.  He is considered to be the chosen Guardian.  As the chosen guardian, he is devoted to returning the sage's blood, which resides within him, into her reborn body, Kotaro. He reveals to Mimiko that once Kotaro fully matures-(which is never explicitly known at the end) and he gives back the sage's blood, he will no longer be around. Since he took in Kotaro as a newborn following Alice's death, there's a chance that Kotaro could be his adopted son.

Jiro's ten-year-old, "younger brother", who does not seem to exhibit powers of a vampire, such as the "Hide Hand."  Although, he seems to have an extremely high pain tolerance: as he is thrown into the ground and walls without injury in almost every episode.  As commented by Mimiko Katsuragi, he does not appear to be the brother of Jiro since he is not hurt by sunlight nor water, unlike Jiro.  Another fact is that they look totally different from each other: Jiro is tall, has black hair and brown eyes, while his brother is short, has blond hair, and blue eyes.  Kotaro stated that they are brothers because they are the last two remaining vampires of their special bloodline.  They both carry goggles around their necks.  He has the same speech pattern and bears a striking resemblance to Jiro's former lover, Alice.  Later, it is revealed that Kotaro is actually the reincarnation of Alice.  He has no special vampiric powers because he still has not recovered the sage's memories from Jiro. Before leaving for the Special Zone, Kotaro's only friends were Sei's older sister the Dark Princess of the North and Grand Duke Bow-wow (a giant friendly grizzly bear) which he also gives the name to his teddy bear at the end of the series. Since he was taken in as a baby by Jiro, there's a possible chance that Jiro could be his adopted father.

Human compromiser who is sent out to mediate the relationship between humans and vampires. She was an orphan that was raised by the Order Coffin Company, which she now works in.  Although considered taboo by the Company, she allowed Jiro to suck a bit of her blood when he was too weak to keep fighting. In the end, she ends up living and working with both Kotaro and Jiro. Mimiko and Alice have similar ideals. She is a strong and independent woman, who tries to understand Jiro's situation and shows that she holds no prejudice against any race.

Often referred to as the Black Snake, Cassandra is an Old Blood vampire that was once friends with Jiro and Alice, however she betrayed them and killed Alice. However, Jiro questions why Cassa, after killing Alice, guarded Alice's ashes. It is later revealed that she is the Lord of the Warlock family and is a reincarnation of Morgan the Witch. Her prestigious bloodline grants her the ability to shapeshift. She was also the first to be bitten by the founder of the Kowloon Children bloodline and was branded a traitor.  During a brief conversation with Jiro, she claims that her happiest moments were with Alice and Jiro.

Cassa is an extremely powerful vampire, capable of matching a fully powered Jiro in combat while not having absorbed any blood herself in three months. Her primary weapons are a chained silver cross and a katana. While Cassa is a skilled swordswoman, Jiro always had the advantage over her when it came to swordplay and fighting.  Even as a Kowloon child, Cassa enjoyed playing jokes and teasing people.  It is revealed in the end that Cassandra's goal all along was to resurrect the Kowloon King and continue his bloodline.  Like all vampires, the continuation of their own bloodline is all that they care about, and Cassa is willing to make any sacrifice in order to ensure its survival.  The few exceptions to this are the killing of Jiro and the ending of the Sage bloodline.

Other characters

Sei bears the title of Dragon King of the East, or "Ryū-Ō".  He also bears the titles Prosecutor of the East and young emissary.  He controls the night of Hong Kong and the Special Zone, protecting Red Blood and Black Blood.  He's a direct descendant of a chaotic bloodline.  Sei also created the barrier and implemented the restrictions that protects the Special Zone.  His eyes are the "switch" for opening and closing the barrier.  When he opens his eyes, the barrier opens, and vice versa.  He could turn into an enormous golden dragon made of pure energy. The current Sei is a now reborn child but before that he was a young adult, mid to late twenties. This took place sometime within the past 10 years.  Even though he was reborn into such a "cute" state (as Jiro puts it), Sei is serious and is one of the most powerful vampires in the story, which makes him highly respected. He could easily make a vampire uneasy with his powerful aura.  He also has an older sister called the Dark Princess of the North. He is shown to, unlike Kotaro have obtained all his memories from a young age.

An 800-year-old Old Blood born in Poland on April 1 called Crimson-eye Zelman, and is the bearer of the god's flame and a legend of the Dark Ages. Zelman has many other titles, including the ancient dark hunter, the follower of the Fire God, the red-eyed murderer, and the prince with blood-colored eyes. He is also one of the rulers of the Special Zone. He comes from a glorious bloodline linking to the great warrior, Asura and is noted to be one of the last of that bloodline.

Zelman Clock is a noble demon, he has his own code of honor and respect for freedom. He has a wild nature and devilish charisma radiating a certain superiority and greatness in everything. Don't try to expect compassion from him, he is provocative and cruel. But on the other hand his personality is more pleasant than that of first sight. The affable evil lord of the House of Darkness and self-proclaimed «bad guy». He makes friends with Kotaro pretty much the first time they meet, and is one of the most powerful vampires alive, helping to suppress the wave of Kowloon Child infection. He doesn't share the worldview and arrogance of his subordinate August.

He is one of the leaders holding territories in the Special area and he controls the so-called group «The Coven». In spite of young appearance he is oldest alive vampire whom everyone must respect. He travels around the world but now lives in the Special area. This place surprises him because people and vampires live together, this fact is pleasant to him.

He is not only descendant of Asura, but he's also possessor of «divine fire». He can use «Eye Ignite» that helps to create a flame in sight. He is a perfect warrior, strategist and he boats unspeakable power for long and short distance battles. He is enthusiastic about combating and despite of all versatile behavior, he is a regular guy.

An Old Blood who works alongside the Company within the Special Zone. Cain is a very strong vampire who has the ability to change into a blue wolf. He is known as a hero of the Kowloon Shock, Retainer of the Warlock family, the Knight of King Azami, and Cain the Blue Wolf. Cain is of the same bloodline as Cassandra and had served the Warlock family before her betrayal. He was also one of Alice's guardians before she died at the hands of Cassandra. He is now a loyal servant to Sei and head of the Marine Bank in the Special Zone.  While Cain uses every chance to disrespect Jiro, he thinks highly of Jiro's powers and skills despite believing Jiro to be immature.  Cain is a powerful sorcerer who seems to be some sort of werewolf; as he is depicted as a blue wolf in a flash back & during his fight with Yafuri Chao he exhibited a partial transformation which allowed him to easy beat Yafuri into submission.

Dark Princess of the North
Sei's older sister whom Sei greatly respects. Kotaro commented that both she and Sei do not like to talk much-(mostly his sister). The Princess has lived for a very long time and is also a descendant of the chaotic bloodline. She resides in the Sacred Precinct with Crow-(also known as "The Sanctuary"), where Jiro and Kotaro previously stayed at when Kotaro was just a baby. She was sad to see him go, so Kotaro consoled her by saying he will write letters to her when he reaches the Special Zone. Despite her quiet demeanor, she apparently has a short temper and while she enjoys Kotaro's company, if Kotaro does something that angers her-(such as when he accidentally sneezed on the scarf that she had made for him), the Dark Princess does not hesitate to hurt him. Her powers are great enough to warp and change the weather surrounding her.

Little is seen of this vampire. He is very skilled with a sword and refers to Jiro as his pupil. He is also a guardian of the Dark Princess of the North.

Also known as Pile Killer Zhang or Chief Zhang. He used to be a vampire hunter, and is now a close ally of Sei. He now works for the president of the Order Coffin Company and is also considered to be one of the leaders in the Special Zone. He mentioned that it is an unwritten rule that the bloodline of the sage should not be messed with. Despite his old age, Zhang still holds enough power to kill a Kowloon child with nothing more than a wooden spike.

A vampire that tries to enter the Special Zone.  She and a group of vampires tried to enter the Special Zone in hope of a better life. However, she is the only one in the group to successfully enter the Special Zone in the end, though deeply traumatized by the loss of all her friends and her surrogate daughter. After the Kowloon children start attacking the Special Zone, Kelly aids the residents in defense of the area.

A vampire girl that was born from the blood of Kelly Wong.  Chan's mother begged Kelly to give Chan some of her blood so Chan could live because at the time Chan was very ill. Later Chan was bitten by a Kowloon child and controlled by Johan Tsang.  In the end, Chan was killed by Kelly in order to stop her from being under Johan's control, as Chan was stopping Jiro from saving Kotaro, and she died in Kelly's arms.

A Kowloon child that hid his identity while staying with Kelly Wong's group. He later took control of most of the group members by sucking their blood and making them obey his command. He is killed by Jiro before he had a chance to enter the Special Zone.

Shougo is Mimiko's boss and the head of the Compromisers team. He reports to the president of the Order Coffin Company and is also considered to be one of the leaders in the Special Zone. Like Zhang, he is a close ally of Sei.

Mimiko's junior Compromiser. She likes gossip and often gets carried away with her speculations.

Head of the Order Coffin Company's Suppression Team.  He is a strict man with a powerful build and absolute devotion to keeping the Special Zone safe.  He is injured when Johan Tsang tries to enter the Special Zone, but still forces himself to fight overwhelming odds during the Kowloon attack despite only being able to use one arm.

A member of the Order Coffin Company. A happy-go-lucky friend of Jiro, Akai is the one to let Jiro off when he is caught by the Suppression Team. He is also the one who made arrangements for the ship which Jiro and Kotaro are seen traveling in at the beginning of the series.

A direct descendant of the Kowloon King of 10 years and is known as Cassa's "younger brother." He is extremely hot-headed and loves to fight. Despite his adolescent appearance, he is well versed in swordsmanship, martial arts, and vampiric power. He tends to act mainly on his own ambitions aside from his orders. His ambitions consist mainly of challenging strong foes, with the assumption that he will always win. He is easily antagonized, especially if he feels that he is not being taken seriously. He harbors a strong jealousy towards Jiro, although he angrily denies it. He is nearly beat to death by Cain, and is sliced into death by Jiro in the end.

Zelman's personal assistant. She is a human who is also willing to let Zelman suck her blood.

Also known as "Walkerman" or "The Other" for his unique abilities to possess the body of others. He is Cassa's human brother who invited her into the Special Zone.  While Zaza possesses someone, his human form is rendered asleep and is the subject of much humiliation by the cruel Cassa. He is impaled through the abdomen by Jiro's silver katana during the last battle of the Special Zone.

The man who heads the Order Coffin Company. He was one of the few human heroes of Hong Kong and had created the Special Zone in the aftermath to hide the Kowloon King's ashes.  He grew up in the Special Zone and transformed the area from slums to a metropolis in only 10 years.  However, he has gotten too old to fight with Jiro on the front lines and thus must sit and manage situations rather than be directly involved. He refused to leave the Special Zone when it was under attack.

Source Blood

An old blood vampire whose bloodline was of the highest rank. She is the oldest vampire of the black bloods. Alice was considered the Mother of Darkness and the founder of the chaotic bloodline. Also known as the Sage. The bloodline of the sage is referred to as the bloodline that transcends death. She fell in love with Jiro during the 19th century and turned him into a vampire when he was on the verge of death. Sadly, she was killed during the Kowloon Shock by the hands of her best friend, Cassandra, but was shortly reincarnated as a newborn baby named Kotaro after her body turned into ashes.

Better known as the King of Kowloon, and known as "father" to the Kowloon Children. Adam is the Source Blood of the youngest bloodline of black bloods, the Kowloon Children.  He is responsible for the Kowloon Shock and the Hong Kong Crusade.  During the crusade he was defeated by Jiro Mochizuki, but presumably immortal, his ashes are sealed in Eleventh Yard and are highly sought after by his children.

Terminology 
Old Blood
Refers to vampires who have lived at least 100 years or more.  Their abilities are far greater than any regular vampire.

Black Blood
Refers to vampires. Vampires of the series have a variety of strengths and weaknesses varying from vampire to vampire. Common strengths include agelessness, extreme strength, turning humans into vampires, and surviving wounds that would kill a human. Jiro is the only old blood shown to be harmed by sunlight and running water, but the Order Coffin Company has a holding cell with crosses and garlic, which are common vampire weaknesses.  All vampires, however, are vulnerable to silver, as most are reduced to ash just by receiving a small scratch from it. Only powerful vampires, like Jiro and Cassa, can survive being impaled by silver.

Red Blood
Refers to humans.

Special Zone
A city that is protected by a barrier that prevents specific vampires from entering, unless invited.  Humans and weaker vampires are oblivious of the barrier.  The leaders of the city are a group of vampires and humans.  Both races coexist within the city.  The fact that the Zone is a hotspot for vampires is a secret from the rest of the world.  The Special Zone was built to be the successor for the city of Hong Kong, which was destroyed during the Kowloon Shock.
Requirements for inviting vampires into the Special Zone:
Must be a human living in the Zone, who knows that they are inviting a vampire.
The inviter must also believe that the Zone is the right place for them.

Kowloon Child
A vampire whose lineage was founded by the Nine Dragon Kings.  They attack both humans and vampires spreading their bloodline to anyone they attack.  They are hated even by other vampires.  Unlike most vampires who need to share their blood with the human to make them a vampire, Kowloon Children only need to suck the blood of the victim.  Humans and vampires can also be turned just by drinking Kowloon blood. Those victims will in turn attack and suck the blood of others.  Those that have their blood sucked by the Kowloon Children will be under the control of the vampire that started the chain of vampires. Also, while most vampires kept near human appearances, almost all Kowloon Children changed radically; their skin paled, nails grew, ears became pointed, eyes became black and yellow, and were reduced to more feral beings.

Order Coffin Company
An organization which is supposed to mediate between vampires and humans.  The president of the company was the one that started the Special Zone.

Suppression Team
A team, within the organization, which prevents vampires, by force, from illegally entering the Special Zone.  They also annihilate vampires who cause disturbances within the Special Zone.

Compromiser
An agent, within the organization, who settles disputes between vampires and humans without violence.  They get in trouble often so they're sometimes accompanied by a guard called the Door Closer.

Hide Hand
An ability that grants vampires the power of telekinesis (e.g.: moving objects, levitating, breaking people's bones, etc.).  It can also create an invisible barrier that can stop bullets.  Only vampires with certain bloodlines have this ability.  Most Kowloon Children (if they are direct descendants) are known to have this ability.

Eye Raid
An ability that grants a vampire to control a person's mind through eye contact.  They can search through their memories, induce hypnosis, and control their actions.  This ability can work on multiple targets at once.

Eye Ignite
A form of vampiric pyrokinesis.  Zelman Clock appears to be the only one who can use this power.

Anime
Black Blood Brothers has a total of 12 episodes, with the first episode airing on September 8, 2006, and the last on November 24, 2006. The series made its North American television debut when it aired on FUNimation Channel starting May 2, 2009, and it began airing on Chiller's  Anime Wednesdays block on July 15, 2015. Chiller abruptly ended its "Anime Wednesday" block. Two pieces of theme music are used for the episodes: one opening theme and one ending theme.

See also
List of fantasy anime
List of light novels
List of programs broadcast by Chiller

References

Further reading

External links
 
Ehrgeiz site 
Funimation site
Madman Entertainment site
Manga Entertainment site

2004 Japanese novels
2006 anime television series debuts
2006 Japanese television series endings
2007 manga
Anime and manga based on light novels
Fujimi Fantasia Bunko
Fujimi Shobo manga
Kadokawa Dwango franchises
Funimation
Group TAC
Kadokawa Shoten manga
Light novels
Shōnen manga
Tokyo MX original programming
Vampires in anime and manga
Vampire novels